Bent Schmidt-Hansen (27 November 1946 – 1 July 2013) was a Danish professional football winger who played for PSV Eindhoven during an injury-shortened career.

Club career
Schmidt-Hansen played for Horsens fS before joining Dutch side PSV Eindhoven in 1967. He would play over 200 league games for them before a persisting back injury cut short his playing career.

International career
Schmidt-Hansen made his debut for Denmark in a July 1966 friendly match against England and has earned a total of 8 caps, scoring no goals.

His final international was a June 1967 friendly match against Sweden.

Death
Schmidt-Hansen died on 1 July 2013. He was survived by his wife and three children.

References

External links
 

1946 births
2013 deaths
People from Horsens
Association football wingers
Danish men's footballers
Denmark international footballers
AC Horsens players
PSV Eindhoven players
Danish expatriate men's footballers
Expatriate footballers in the Netherlands
Eredivisie players
Sportspeople from the Central Denmark Region